Party & Destroy is the debut EP by American DJ and producer, Party Favor. It was released through Mad Decent on 12 August 2016.

Track listing

References

External links 
 

2016 debut EPs
Electronic EPs
EPs by American artists